Jenny Strauss Clay is the William R. Kenan, Jr. Professor of Classics at the University of Virginia. After completing studies at Reed College and the University of Chicago, Strauss Clay completed her doctorate at the University of Washington. She taught at the University of California at Irvine and Johns Hopkins University. She is currently a member of the Nominating Committee of the Society for Classical Studies (formerly the American Philological Association), until 2018.

Family
Strauss Clay is the daughter of Eliezer Paul Kraus and Bettina Strauss, adopted by her uncle Leo Strauss.

Selected publications
The Politics of Olympus: Form and Meaning in the Major Homeric Hymns. (1989); 
Mega Nepios: Il destinatorio nell'epos didascalico. The addressee in Didactic Epic.  Co-edited by Alessandro Schiesaro and P. Mitsis. (1993)
The Wrath of Athena: gods and men in the Odyssey. (1997);  
Hesiod's Cosmos. (2003); 
Homer's Trojan theater: space, vision, and memory in the Iliad. (2011); 
Panhellenes at Methone: graphê in Late Geometric and Protoarchaic Methone. Trends in classics – Supplementary Volumes, 44. Co-editor with Irad Malkin and Yannis Z. Tzifopoulos. (2017);

References
Eugene R. Sheppard, Leo Strauss and the Politics of Exile (Brandeis Univ. Pr., 2006), 82

External links
Strauss Clay's Academia Site

Living people
American classical scholars
Women classical scholars
Scholars of ancient Greek history
American women historians
Scholars of ancient Greek literature
Scholars of Ancient Greek
University of Virginia people
Year of birth missing (living people)
University of California, Irvine faculty
Johns Hopkins University faculty
Jewish American historians
21st-century American Jews
21st-century American women